The 2006 Liberal Democrats deputy leadership election began on 2 March 2006, when the sitting Deputy Leader of the Liberal Democrats, Sir Menzies Campbell, was elected leader of the party. Campbell had been deputy leader since February 2003.

The post was elected by and from the party's 63 Members of Parliament in the House of Commons, who voted on 29 March 2006. Vince Cable was elected as deputy leader in the second round. There were three candidates: Vince Cable, David Heath and Matthew Taylor. Three further MPs, Susan Kramer, Phil Willis and Ed Davey, canvassed support from colleagues but did not enter nominations.

Result

David Heath was eliminated after the first round, and his second preferences were redistributed.

See also
2003 Liberal Democrats deputy leadership election

References

Liberal Democrat deputy leadership election
Deputy Leadership election 2006
Liberal Democrats deputy leadership election